The 2023 Minnesota United FC season is the club's seventh in Major League Soccer. Their season begins on February 25, 2023, where they FC Dallas in Frisco. The club will play its home matches at Allianz Field in Saint Paul, Minnesota. The club will try to reach the MLS Cup Playoffs for a fifth consecutive year.

Technical Staff
As of February 20th, 2022

Roster
As of February 23rd, 2023 

On February 10, Emanuel Reynoso was suspended without pay for failing to arrive for Preseason.

Transfers

Transfers in

MLS SuperDraft

Transfers out

Loans in

Loans out

Friendlies

Competitions

MLS regular season

Standings

Overall

Western Conference

Results summary

Regular season

MLS Cup Playoffs

U.S. Open Cup

Leagues Cup

Central 2

Statistics

Appearances and goals
Last updated March 18th, 2023.

|-
! colspan="14" style="background:#21201E;color:#9BCEE3;border:1px solid #E1E2DD; text-align:center"|Goalkeepers

|-
! colspan="14" style="background:#21201E;color:#9BCEE3;border:1px solid #E1E2DD; text-align:center"|Defenders

|-
! colspan="14" style="background:#21201E;color:#9BCEE3;border:1px solid #E1E2DD; text-align:center"|Midfielders

|-
! colspan="14" style="background:#21201E;color:#9BCEE3;border:1px solid #E1E2DD; text-align:center"|Forwards

|-
! colspan="14" style="background:#21201E;color:#9BCEE3;border:1px solid #E1E2DD; text-align:center"| Player(s) transferred out but featured this season

|-
|}

Goalscorers

Assists

Disciplinary record

Clean sheets

Honors and awards

Bell Bank Man of the Match
 Note: Bell Bank Man of the Match is voted on by fans on Twitter near the end of each MLS Match.

MLS Team of the Week

MLS Player of the Week

MLS All-Stars

References 

Minnesota United FC seasons
Minnesota United
Minnesota
Minnesota